Scott Hilton is an American banker and politician from Georgia. Hilton is a Republican member of the Georgia House of Representatives from District 48. He formerly represented District 95. Hilton is a Senior Vice President in a national bank.

Education 
Hilton earned a bachelor's degree with honors in finance and international business with a minor in psychology from Georgetown University in 2002. Hilton earned a one-year accelerated MBA from Emory University in 2006.

Career 
From 2006 to 2016, Hilton was a senior vice president at Bank of America Merrill Lynch. In 2016, Hilton became the senior vice president of commercial banking at SunTrust Banks (now, Truist Financial).

On November 8, 2016, Hilton won election unopposed and became a Republican member of Georgia House of Representatives for District 95. Hilton was sworn in on January 9, 2017.
In November 2018, Hilton lost the election for District 95 with 48.60% of the vote. Hilton was defeated by Beth Moore.

On November 8, 2022, Hilton defeated Democrat Mary Robichaux for election to District 48 with 54.3% of the vote and was sworn in on January 9, 2023.

Hilton has authored or sponsored 95 bills. He is a member of the Republican party.

Hilton served as executive director for the Georgians First Commission under the Office of Governor Brian Kemp.

Personal life 
Hilton's wife is Meredith Hilton, an attorney. They have three children. Hilton and his family live in Peachtree Corners, Georgia.

References

External links 
 Scott Hilton at ballotpedia.org
 Scott Hilton at georgetown.edu

21st-century American politicians
Living people
Republican Party members of the Georgia House of Representatives
SunTrust Banks people
Year of birth missing (living people)